Battle of Saint Gotthard was fought on 13 December 1705 between a Hungarian (Kuruc) army led by János Bottyán and an Austrian-Croatian-Serbian combined army under the command of Hannibal von Heister. The battle took place at Szentgotthárd (West-Hungary, County Vas) and Nagyfalva (Mogersdorf) (today Austria), near the Austro-Hungarian border. The result of the battle was a Hungarian victory.

On 2 November 1705 János Bottyán actuated the Hungarian campaign in Transdanubia. Before that he had only 8,000 soldiers at Kecskemét but this number later increased to 30,000 men.

On 10 December Kőszeg capitulated and Bottyán moved to Szentgotthárd, where Heister was. The Kuruc Army between Mogersdorf and Szentgotthárd attacked the Austrians (the Habsburg troops was also consisted of several Croatian and Serbian corps).

After the battle Heister headed for Stadtschlaining (Szalonak) and the Dunántúl was freed.

References
Szentgotthárd, monography, Szombathely 1981. 
Hundred Hungarian village Book-House (Száz magyar falu könyvesháza) Mária Kozár - Ferenc Gyurácz: Felsőszölnök, Száz magyar falu könyvesháza Kht. 
Ágnes R. Várkonyi: Age of Reform's (Megújulások kora), Magyar Könyvklub, Budapest 2001. 
Former counties and towns in Hungary (Magyarország vármegyéi, városai, the monography of Hungary) Vasvármegye, Budapest „Apollo” Irodalmi és Nyomdai Részvénytársaság 1898.

Conflicts in 1705
Battles involving Austria
Battles involving Hungary
Battles involving Habsburg Croatia
Battles involving Serbia
Military history of Austria
Military history of Hungary
1705 in the Habsburg monarchy
18th century in Hungary
18th-century military history of Croatia
Rákóczi's War of Independence